Sadzawicki (feminine: Sadzawicka; plural: Sadzawiccy) is a Polish surname. Notable people include:

 Dominik Sadzawicki (born 1994), Polish footballer
 Krzysztof Sadzawicki (born 1970), Polish footballer

See also
 

Polish-language surnames